Taylor Donovan (born ) is an Australian female volleyball player. She is part of the Australia women's national volleyball team.

She participated in the 2014 FIVB Volleyball World Grand Prix.
On club level she played for Queensland in 2014.

References

External links
 Profile at FIVB.org

1992 births
Living people
Australian women's volleyball players
Place of birth missing (living people)